Stephan Edler von Wohlleben (1751 – 30 July 1823) was a mayor of Vienna.

References 

Mayors of Vienna
Edlers of Austria
1751 births
1823 deaths
Politicians from Vienna